Lake Katherine is a small freshwater lake surrounded by a park in Arcadia, Florida. The lake is surrounded by a walking path, park benches and an exercise station. A T-33 jet is on display on the west side of the lake and a fountain is roughly in the center of the lake.

No boating or swimming is allowed in Lake Katherine. The lake is additionally uninhabited by fish.

References

Katherine
Katherine